Pattabhiraman is a 2019 Indian Malayalam-language comedy drama satirical film directed by Kannan Thamarakkulam and written by Dinesh Pallath. It stars Jayaram, Miya George, Sheelu Abraham, Prem Kumar and Sai Kumar.Later the film was dubbed into Telugu as Sarkaru Vaari.

Pattabhiraman was released at 23 August 2019 and received mainly positive reviews upon release, by audiences praising cast's performances,script,narration and social message.

Premise
Pattabhiraman is a food inspector who is on a crusade against artificiality in food products. Things turn bad when he clashes with KRK, a FMCG  company owner, whose company produces chemically unhealthy foods.

Cast

Release
The official trailer of the film was unveiled by Millennium Audios on 8 August 2019.

The film was theatrically released on 23 August 2019  by Abaam Movies.

Soundtrack

The soundtrack of the film was composed by M. Jayachandran and lyrics were by Kaithapram and Murukan Kattakada. The songs are sung by M. G. Sreekumar, K. S. Chithra, M. Jayachandran and Sangeethaa-Sangeetha Sajith.

References

External links
 

2019 films
Indian comedy-drama films
2010s Malayalam-language films
Films scored by M. Jayachandran
Films directed by Kannan Thamarakkulam